Mount Hayter is a peak in Antarctica,  high, standing  southeast of Laird Plateau on the west side of Olson Neve. It was seen by the New Zealand Geological Survey Antarctic Expedition (1964–65) and named for Adrian Hayter, leader at Scott Base in 1965.

References

Mountains of Oates Land